Sebastian Avanzini (born 1 April 1995) is an Italian professional footballer who plays as a midfielder or left-back for Malaysia Super League club Kuala Lumpur City. Besides Denmark, he has played in the Faroe Islands and Malaysia.

Career
Avanzini started his career at Lyngby Boldklub. He later joined BSF where he quickly became a profile for the team in the Denmark Series. Avanzini then joined Boldklubben Frem in 2017 before moving to Skovshoved IF in the Danish 2nd Division. He had a impressive season in Skovshoved, which was noticed by Bo Henriksen, who decided to bring him to Danish Superliga club AC Horsens in July 2018 on a six-months contract. Three months later, the deal was extended until the summer 2022. On 19 December 2019, it was confirmed that his contract had been terminated.

In January 2020, Avanzini joined KÍ Klaksvík in the Faroe Islands. On 9 May 2020 it was announced that his contract had been terminated by mutual agreement. He returned to Denmark and signed with Danish 1st Division club Hvidovre IF on 1 October 2020.

After only one season at Hvidovre, Avanzini moved to Hobro IK on 13 July 2021, signing a deal until June 2024. His contract was terminated by mutual consent on 10 October 2022, making him a free agent.

In January 2023 he signed for Malaysian club Kuala Lumpur City.

References

1996 births
Living people
Italian footballers
Association football midfielders
Association football defenders
Lyngby Boldklub players
Ballerup-Skovlunde Fodbold players
Boldklubben Frem players
Skovshoved IF players
AC Horsens players
KÍ Klaksvík players
Hvidovre IF players
Hobro IK players
Kuala Lumpur City F.C. players
Danish Superliga players
Danish 1st Division players
Danish 2nd Division players
Italian expatriate footballers
Italian expatriates in the Faroe Islands
Expatriate footballers in the Faroe Islands
Italian expatriate sportspeople in Denmark
Expatriate men's footballers in Denmark
Italian expatriate sportspeople in Malaysia
Expatriate footballers in Malaysia